Westfields Football Club  is a football team from Hereford, England, formed in 1966 and currently playing in the .  The club is affiliated to the Herefordshire County FA.

History
Westfields FC were formed in November 1966 by a group of local youths who played friendlies on Widemarsh Common.  One of the youths, Andy Morris, is still involved with the club and is now its chief executive.

Westfields initially entered the Herefordshire Sunday League, where they played for ten years, winning a number of trophies.  In 1973, they fielded their first Saturday team in the Worcester and District League.  Two years later they moved their ground from the King George V playing fields to Thorn Lighting's Rotherwas headquarters where they gradually developed the ground over the subsequent years.

In 1978 the club stepped up to the West Midlands (Regional) League, initially in Division Two.  Promotion to Division One came in 1983–84, followed by a further step up to the Premier Division three years later.

The 2002–03 season saw the Fields do a league and county cup double, becoming the West Midlands Regional League Premier Division champions for the first time and defeating rivals Kington Town to win the Herefordshire County Senior Challenge Cup. The title win saw them promoted to the Midland Alliance, where they finished sixth in their first season, although their second season saw them flirt with relegation before finishing in 20th position.

In the 2015–16 season, Westfields progressed through to the Herefordshire County Cup Final at Edgar Street, but lost to newly-formed Hereford F.C. of the Midland Football League.

During the 2016–17 season they qualified for the first round of the FA Cup for the first time in their history where they played Curzon Ashton and were knocked out after losing 3–1 in a replay after drawing 1–1 initially at home.

Colours
Westfields took their claret and blue colours from West Ham United, as its founders admired Bobby Moore, Martin Peters and Sir Geoff Hurst, who were part of the England squad that won the World Cup in the year they were founded.

Ground
After playing for many years at the sports ground of Thorn Lighting on the Rotherwas Industrial Estate to the south of Hereford, Westfields began their first Midland Alliance campaign playing their home games at Stourport Swifts' Walshes Meadow ground. Westfields moved to a new £250,000 ground in the heart of the city in December 2003. The new ground gained the rather unusual name of allpay.park after a sponsorship deal with Hereford-based firm allpay.net.

Current squad

Backroom staff

Club records

Best league performance: 2nd in Midland Football Alliance, 2011–12, 2012–13
Best FA Cup performance: First Round Proper, 2016–17
Best FA Vase performance: Fourth round, 1986–87, 2013–14
 Record attendance: 1825 against Hereford 31 August 2015

References

Sources

External links
 Official website

Association football clubs established in 1966
Midland Football Alliance
Football clubs in Herefordshire
1966 establishments in England
Midland Football League
West Midlands (Regional) League
Football clubs in England
Hellenic Football League